Shadnagar is a Town and assembly constituency in the Ranga Reddy districtin  Telangana, India. As part of the reorganisation of districts in Telangana, Shadnagar separated from Mahabubnagar district and merged into Ranga Reddy district Headquarters. 

Shadnagar is the site of the Indian Space Research Organisation National Remote Sensing Centre. 

Bill Gates visited the community hospital for an immunization session and administered the polio vaccine to residents in 2002.

History 

Shadnagar was founded between 1869 and 1911 under the sixth Nizam - Mir Mahboob Ali Khan.

References

Cities and towns in Ranga Reddy district